Gaultheria depressa, commonly known as the mountain snow berry or alpine wax berry, is a small ground-hugging shrub of the heath family Ericaceae native to rocky alpine areas of Tasmania, Australia, and New Zealand.

Description

It grows larger in New Zealand. The small leaves can be oval or round and measure  in length and have serrate margins. The berries are edible.

Taxonomy
Joseph Dalton Hooker described Gaultheria depressa in 1847 from a collection by Ronald Campbell Gunn at Ben Lomond in Tasmania. The species name is Latin depressa "flat". Analysis of DNA shows the next closest relative to Gaultheria depressa is the New Zealand species Gaultheria antipoda, which suggests the Australian populations of G. depressa dispersed to Australia from New Zealand. The next closest relative to the two species is the New Zealand species Gaultheria oppositifolia.

Distribution and habitat 
In New Zealand, the prostrate habit and dependent fruit shielded by foliage from above suggest it is suited for dispersal by lizards. Furthermore, the ground weta species (Zealandosandrus maculifrons) has been recorded eating the fruit.

It is suitable for rockeries in gardens in temperate climates and has been available commercially in England. It prefers well-drained acidic soil in part shade.

Uses
Early settlers in the southern district of New Zealand Otago used to make snowberry pies out of the Gaultheria depressa fruit.

Varieties
This species has the following varieties:

Gaultheria depressa var. depressa (native to Tasmania and New Zealand)
Gaultheria depressa var. novae-zealandiae (endemic to New Zealand)

References

depressa
Ericales of Australia
Flora of Tasmania
Flora of New Zealand
Plants described in 1847
Taxa named by Joseph Dalton Hooker